Slave Labor in Nazi Concentration Camps is a book by German historian Marc Buggeln which deals with the forced labor that prisoners had to perform in Nazi concentration camps. The book, which primarily deals with Neuengamme concentration camp and its subcamps, was published in 2014 by Oxford University Press.

References

History books about Nazi concentration camps
2014 non-fiction books
Oxford University Press books
Neuengamme concentration camp